Chkalov (also Romanized as Ch’kalov) is a village in the Lori Province of Armenia.

References

Populated places in Lori Province